Asptro is a contract bridge  bidding convention used to intervene over a 1NT  opening bid.  Its methodology and hence its designation is a combination of two similar conventions – Aspro and Astro. 

2 shows at least 5-4 either way round in hearts, the anchor, and a minor suit. Exceptionally the intervenor holds hearts and spades with preference for spades.
2 shows at least 5-4 either way round in spades, the anchor, and another suit. If the other suit is hearts, there is preference for hearts.
2 and 2 are natural.

Partner can bid two of the anchor suit, 2M, expecting to play that contract (sign off). 2 is a non-forcing enquiry, if available, and 2NT is a forcing enquiry. Other replies are natural. Responder can also pass with 6+ length in the bid minor. (You cannot expect support from partner but it might be the least evil).

After a 2 reply, the 2 intervenor passes with five diamonds or bids the 5 card suit, always the unknown one with 5-5. 

After a 2NT reply, the intervenor routinely bids the unknown suit. Both the anchor and the unknown major imply both majors with preference for the new one. Thus 3 and 3 may be refined, such as by a strength difference with 3 stronger.

See also
List of defenses to 1NT

References

Bridge conventions